Maungaongaonga  is an  high dacite volcano located between Rotorua and Taupō in the North Island Volcanic Plateau. The area of the mountain is a scenic reserve and some of its southern slopes are highly geothermally active.

Geography
Maungaongaonga is located at the far western border of the Okataina Volcanic Centre. To the east across the Hakereteke stream valley (historically called Kerosene creek) is the slightly lower but more striking Maunga Kākaramea or Rainbow mountain which is often steaming from its geothermal field. To the North west is the still active Waimangu Volcanic Rift Valley. Also to the south, about the  level, are pumice raft blocks on the valley margins, as for a period following the Taupo eruption of 232 CE the whole area of lowland extending towards Taupo and the present Waikato River was a lake.

Geology
There have been quite large hydrothermal eruptions from areas adjacent to the base of the mountain and whose erupted material overlay the Hatepe eruption pumice resulting in estimated eruption ages of about 1300 CE. Warm ground extends up to some of the southern ridges of the volcano. The hot water spring geothermal activity is confined to the downthrown side of the Ngapouri-Rotomahana Fault but steam geothermal activity is on both sides of the fault reflecting the highest heat output for the Waiotapu geothermal area. This fault is a splay of the Paeroa Fault at the eastern margin of the Taupō Rift of the Taupō Volcanic Zone and indeed the Paeroa range extends south-south-west of Maungaongaonga along this fault line that is displacing at a rate of 7.2 ± 0.4 mm/yr.

Biology
The lower part of the Maungaongaonga Scenic Reserve along the Waikite valley is dangerous to access due to its geothermal features. However the difficulty in access means it is classified as high quality geothermal habitat with four at risk species being geothermal kānuka (Kunzea ericoides), the ferns Dicranopteris linearis  and Nephrolepis flexuosa , and Korthalsella salicornioides.

See also
 List of volcanoes in New Zealand

References

External links
 

Hot springs of New Zealand
1886 eruption of Mount Tarawera
Volcanoes of Waikato
Mountains of Waikato
Taupō Volcanic Zone
Geothermal areas in New Zealand
Okataina Volcanic Centre